The Sophia Range is a low, small mountain range on southern Nootka Island, forming a peninsula west of Tahsis Inlet, between Esperanza Inlet and Nuchatlitz Inlet, British Columbia, Canada. It is made up of hills and has an area of 150 km2 and is a subrange of the Vancouver Island Ranges which in turn form part of the Insular Mountains.

In the 1850s five daughters of Captain Edward E. Langford were the belles of Victoria. Captain George H. Richards named this range after Sophia Elizabeth, the fourth daughter of Langford.

See also
List of mountain ranges

References

External links
 

Vancouver Island Ranges
Mountain ranges of British Columbia